An entertainment robot is, as the name indicates, a robot that is not made for utilitarian use, as in production or domestic services, but for the sole subjective pleasure of the human. It serves, usually the owner or his housemates, guests or clients. Robotics technologies are applied in many areas of culture and entertainment.

Expensive robotics are applied to the creation of narrative environments in commercial venues where servo motors, pneumatics and hydraulic actuators are used to create movement with often preprogrammed responsive behaviors such as in Disneyland's haunted house ride.

Entertainment robots can also be seen in the context of media arts where artist have been employing advanced technologies to create environments and artistic expression also utilizing the actuators and sensor to allow their robots to react and change in relation to viewers.

Toy robot

Relatively cheap, mass-produced entertainment robots are used as mechanical, sometimes interactive, toys which perform various tasks and tricks on command. The first commercial hit was, not surprisingly, modelled on the most popular pet: the canine.

Robotic dog

Robot dogs as a fad have been produced with relatively little variation. These are some commercial models:
 Teksta, a toy robot dog popular in the 1990s which was intended to be able to perform card tricks and respond to commands.
 Aibo (robot dog manufactured by Sony)
 Poo-Chi
 I-Cybie
 iDog (Sega's robot iPod music speaker)
 Gupi, a robotic guinea pig
 Space Dog, the remote control dog

Robot dogs also appear fairly frequently in fiction compared to other forms of personal entertainment robots.
 K-9, The Doctor's portable computer and robot, from the British BBC Television series Doctor Who.
 Preston, Wendolene's robot dog from the 1995 animated Wallace and Gromit film A Close Shave.
 Goddard, pet of Jimmy Neutron.

Humanoid entertainment robots

Despite those humanoid robots for utilitarian uses, there are some humanoid robots which aims at entertainment uses, such as Sony's QRIO and Wow Wee's RoboSapien. They are usually capable of some advanced features like Voice Recognition or Walking.

Substitute pets

While primitive robot toy models only execute standardized pre-programmed routines, sometimes little more than a wind-up toy could do, advancing technology allows for interaction with the user and/or other environmental stimuli (e.g. sensor-detected obstacles), thus somewhat resembling a live playmate.

Nevertheless, in the mind of some users the things can hold the loved place of a pet, as demonstrated by the fact that some even sleep with a metallic one instead of a plush cuddly toy.

In fact manufacturers even found it pays to produce a toy that is essentially designed to be nurtured, rather like an egg in some 'parenting experience simulations', as proven by the success of the Japanese Tamagotchi.

Commercial show robots
For machines for the entertainment industry, cost is not the driving factor in design choices, and so the robots are often at a price point outside of what a private person would choose to pay 

These robots are made for use as:
shop-front  - created by a manufacturer to show what they are technologically capable of and so promote their other products.
prop - inanimate performer or even artificial actor in show, TV and movie production (as the fictitious first toy robots, see above); as technology advances, some advanced robots can, often helped with other special effects, to make them seem what cannot (yet), even be significantly more than a cast extra, such as the droids R2-D2 and C-3PO in the Star Wars double trilogy (1977-2005) which have proved rather popular from the start.
promotions - Used at trade shows where they move about a trade show floor providing tongue-in-cheek interaction with trade show attendees in order to bring said attendees to a particular company's trade show booth. 
exhibit - Robots such as Robothespian are used at venues such science museums to explain concepts or just be an interactive exhibit in their own right

Non-commercial art robots 
In 1956, Nicolas Schöffer created Cysp 1 (Spatiodynamique Cybernétique), a robot and dancer working together to create an abstract sculpture and choreography with concrete music by Pierre Henry. These works could react to color, sound and light.

Survival Research Laboratories, in San Francisco, California, creates large destructive robotic performances to roast contemporary culture and express their distaste for the military-industrial complex.

Emergent Systems is creating large-scale interactive art environments where robots are able to respond to humans and each other as they react and evolve in the robotic installations. Autopoiesis was one such artificial life work that allowed a series of robots constructed of grapevines to both act as individuals and a group. Augmented Fish Reality allowed Siamese fighting fish to control their robots to meet across the gap of their glass fish bowls.

Intel Museum hosts the A.I. driven interactive robot, ARTI, which is short for "artificial intelligence". This robot is considered to be a work of fine art and is capable of recognizing faces, understands speech and even teaches the museum guests about the history of the museum and its founders, Robert Noyes and Gordon Moore. ARTI's face is made out of an inanimate silicon wafer.

See also
Digital pet
Domestic robot
Humanoid robot
List of robotic dogs

References

External links 

 Ken Rinaldo website

 
Dance animation